This timeline shows the dates (and order of release) of all of the various media relating to Douglas Adams' The Hitchhiker's Guide to the Galaxy series. Where multiple releases/broadcasts occurred, the first one is given.

References

The Hitchhiker's Guide to the Galaxy lists